Ernad Skulić (born 2 May 1980), is a Bosnian-born Croatian retired footballer who last played for NK Sava Drenje.

Playing career 

Skulić started out at Inter Zaprešić, making 150 league appearances and scoring twenty goals over the span of seven seasons.  He then moved, in 2008, to FK Baku, where he made over one hundred league appearances.

Skulić has also appeared for FK Baku in four UEFA Champions League matches, as well as one UEFA Europa League match.

References

External links
 

1980 births
Living people
People from Doboj
Croats of Bosnia and Herzegovina
Association football midfielders
Croatian footballers
NK Inter Zaprešić players
FC Baku players
NK Lučko players
Ethnikos Achna FC players
Croatian Football League players
Azerbaijan Premier League players
Cypriot First Division players
First Football League (Croatia) players
Croatian expatriate footballers
Expatriate footballers in Azerbaijan
Croatian expatriate sportspeople in Azerbaijan
Expatriate footballers in Cyprus
Croatian expatriate sportspeople in Cyprus